International Jazz Festivals Organization (IJFO) is an umbrella organization including 16 leading jazz festivals worldwide.

IJFO sponsors an international jazz award presented in partnership with the International Association for Jazz Education (IAJE) at their annual conferences, and rewards upcoming talents in the genre of jazz.

The recipient of the 2007 International Jazz Award for New Talent is Mathias Eick.

Visit the IJFO website by clicking here!!

Jazz organizations
International cultural organizations